William Downes may refer to:

William Downes, 1st Baron Downes (1751–1826), Irish judge
William Downes (cricketer) (1843–1896), New Zealand cricketer
William F. Downes (born 1946), U.S. federal judge